Spielverein Asbach-Bad Hersfeld is a German association football club based in Asbach, formerly a separate village, but now part of the town of Bad Hersfeld, Hesse.

History

The earliest football played in Asbach was in 1911 and prior to World War I two clubs emerged. Spielvereinigung Asbach and Sportverein Germania Asbach were youth clubs that disappeared as a consequence of the war. A number of short-lived sports and gymnastics clubs came and went between 1922 and the formation on 5 August 1928 of Sportverein Asbach. This club also struggled early on, but managed to persevere. By 1936 SV had a number of local honours to its credit and was finally able to establish its own ground.

SVA long played in the shadow of Hessen Hersfeld, but after a 1993 title in the Bezirksoberliga Fulda (V) has become a fixture in the Landesliga Hesse-Nord (V). Following a second-place finish in the Verbandsliga Hessen-Nord (VI) in 2008–09, SVA was promoted to the Hessenliga but lasted for only one season before going down again. Another relegation followed in 2015–16, now to the Gruppenliga.

Honours
The club's honours:
 Verbandsliga Hessen-Nord
 Champions: 1998
 Runners-up: 2001, 2003, 2009

Recent seasons
 1990–91 Bezirksoberliga Fulda (V) 6th
 1991–92 Bezirksoberliga Fulda (V) 6th
 1992–93 Bezirksoberliga Fulda (V) 1st ↑
 1993–94 Landesliga Hesse-Nord (V) 3rd
 1994–95 Landesliga Hesse-Nord (V) 7rd
 1995–96 Landesliga Hesse-Nord (V) 6th
 1996–97 Landesliga Hesse-Nord (V) 3rd
 1997–98 Landesliga Hesse-Nord (V) 1st ↑
 1998–99 Oberliga Hesse (IV) 11th
 1999–00 Oberliga Hesse (IV) 16th ↓
 2000–01 Landesliga Hesse-Nord (V) 2nd
 2001–02 Landesliga Hesse-Nord (V) 6nd
 2002–03 Landesliga Hesse-Nord (V) 2nd
 2003–04 Landesliga Hesse-Nord (V) 5th
 2004–05 Landesliga Hesse-Nord (V) 5th
 2005–06 Landesliga Hesse-Nord (V) 7th
 2006–07 Landesliga Hesse-Nord (V) 5th
 2007–08 Landesliga Hesse-Nord (V) 4th
 2008–09 Landesliga Hesse-Nord (V) 2nd ↑
 2009–10 Oberliga Hesse (V) 19th ↓
 2010–11 Verbandsliga Hessen-Nord (VI) 7th
 2011–12 Verbandsliga Hessen-Nord (VI) 5th

References

External links
 Official website 
 Das deutsche Fußball-Archiv  historical German domestic league tables
 SVA Bad Hersfeld at Weltfussball.de 

Football clubs in Germany
Football clubs in Hesse
Association football clubs established in 1928
1928 establishments in Germany